The IT, Electronics and Communications department is one of the governing body of Government of Telangana for the purpose of promoting the use of Information Technology (IT), the field of Information Technology in the state and building an IT driven continue of Government services.

References 

State agencies of Telangana